Moscos & Stone was a short-lived Australian band formed in 1978. The group released two albums, before splitting in 1981.

Discography

Studio albums

Singles

References

Australian rock music groups
Musical groups established in 1978
Musical groups disestablished in 1981